Weaver's Antique Service Station is a gas station built in c.1930, which is restored and still evocative of the 1930s, located in Burlington, West Virginia on Northwestern Turnpike (also known as U.S. Route 50), near its intersection with Patterson Creek Road.

It is listed on the National Register of Historic Places as a contributing building within the Burlington Historic District.   It is a vernacular wood-frame building, with stucco plaster over 1/8 inch wire mesh.  A wood outbuilding, built c.1900, is included in the property, which in 1992 served as a museum of local historical artifacts.  It is located on the south side of U.S. Route 50.

See also
List of historic filling stations

References

Landmarks in West Virginia
Buildings and structures in Mineral County, West Virginia
Northwestern Turnpike
Historic gas stations in the United States
Retail buildings in West Virginia
Defunct museums in West Virginia
Gas stations on the National Register of Historic Places in West Virginia